Raghuvir Singh Rathore (born 21 September 1938) is a former Indian cricket umpire. He stood in two Test matches between 1990 and 1993 and four ODI games between 1986 and 1991. Rathore played a first-class match for Rajasthan, in the semi-final of the 1962–63 Ranji Trophy, against Delhi.

See also
 List of Test cricket umpires
 List of One Day International cricket umpires

References

1938 births
Living people
Place of birth missing (living people)
Indian Test cricket umpires
Indian One Day International cricket umpires
Indian cricketers
Rajasthan cricketers